Careers to Come is a Canadian documentary television miniseries which aired on CBC Television from 1976 to 1977.

Premise
The series was geared towards female youth to indicate that some previously male-only careers have opened to women.

Scheduling
This half-hour series was broadcast on Wednesdays and Thursdays at 4:30 p.m. (Eastern) from 24 March to 1 April 1976. It was rebroadcast from 15 to 29 March 1977.

Episodes
 "No, Mary Jane. . . You Can't Be A Fireman"
 "Yes, Mary Jane. . . You Can Be A Firefighter"
 "Mary Jane, You Can Be Anything You Want To Be"

References

External links
 

1976 Canadian television series debuts
1977 Canadian television series endings
1970s Canadian documentary television series
CBC Television original programming
Feminism in Canada